Betaglycan also known as Transforming growth factor beta receptor III (TGFBR3), is a cell-surface chondroitin sulfate / heparan sulfate proteoglycan >300 kDa in molecular weight. Betaglycan binds to various members of the TGF-beta superfamily of ligands via its core protein, and bFGF via its heparan sulfate chains. TGFBR3 is the most widely expressed type of TGF-beta receptor. Its affinity towards all individual isoforms of TGF-beta is similarly high and therefore it plays an important role as a coreceptor mediating the binding of TGF-beta to its other receptors - specifically TGFBR2. The intrinsic kinase activity of this receptor has not yet been described. In regard of TGF-beta signalling it is generally considered a non-signaling receptor or a coreceptor. By binding to various member of the TGF-beta superfamily at the cell surface it acts as a reservoir of TGF-beta.

Study of a mouse knock-out for the Tgfbr3 gene showed a fundamental effect on the correct development of organs and the overall viability of the animals used. Within the same study, no significant changes in Smad signalling (typical for TGF-beta cascade) were detected. This fact suggests that additional, as yet undescribed functions of betaglycan may be mediated by non-classical signalling pathways.

Domains and function 
TGFBR3 is composed of an extracellular receptor domain consisting of 849 amino acids which is intracellularly connected to a short cytoplasmic domain. Betaglycan, being expressed by a whole range of various cell types within the organism, can be found in the form of a membrane-bound receptor, or as a soluble protein capable of interactions with the extracellular matrix (ECM).

The formation of soluble betaglycan is mediated by metalloproteinases and other enzymes present in the ECM. Proteolytic cleavage releases an ectodomain containing two binding sites for TGF-beta. Due to high affinity to its ligand, free betaglycan is an important factor in the deposition and neutralization of this cytokine within the ECM. The ratio of membrane and soluble variant in the organism significantly affects the availability of TGF-beta and subsequent intracellular signalling.

The cytoplasmic domain mediates interactions with scaffold proteins inside the cell. These intracellular interactions do not affect the functionality of the ectodomain - nor its affinity to TGF-beta. However, they affect cell migration and the overall responsiveness of a given cell to the action of TGF-beta.

Re-release of the cytokine can occur due to the proteolytic activity of the pro-apoptotic serine protease - granzyme B. Plasmin - a serine protease present in the blood, activated as part of inflammatory reactions, then participates in the definitive degradation of betaglycan.

See also
 TGF beta receptors

References

Further reading

External links
 

TGF beta receptors